Events from the year 1836 in Scotland.

Incumbents

Law officers 
 Lord Advocate – John Murray
 Solicitor General for Scotland – John Cunninghame

Judiciary 
 Lord President of the Court of Session – Lord Granton
 Lord Justice General – The Duke of Montrose until 30 December (separate office abolished on his death)
 Lord Justice Clerk – Lord Boyle

Events 
 17 May – Arbroath and Forfar Railway authorised.
 19 May – Dundee and Arbroath Railway authorised.
 June – 17 miniature coffins of unknown provenance are found in a cave on Arthur's Seat in Edinburgh.
 1 July – North of Scotland Bank (a constituent of Clydesdale Bank) established in Aberdeen by Alexander Anderson and others.
 16 July – the brig Mariner leaves Loch Eriboll on the north coast for Cape Breton Island and Quebec in British North America with 154 emigrants, mostly from the nearby Reay district.
 30 July – Savings Bank of Glasgow established.
 7 August – St Andrew's Cathedral, Dundee (Roman Catholic) opened.
 13 August – Edinburgh, Leith and Newhaven Railway authorised.
 Botanical Society of Scotland established as the Botanical Society of Edinburgh.
 Glasgow and Ship Bank established by merger of the Glasgow Banking Company and the Ship Bank.
 Robert Napier launches the paddle sloop Berenice for the East India Company, the first steam warship built in Scotland, the (wooden) hull being subscontracted to John Wood of Port Glasgow.
 Construction of Granton harbour begun
 Construction of modern Inverness Castle.
 Former windmill at Maxwelltown opens as converted into an astronomical observatory and the world's oldest working camera obscura, basis of the modern-day Dumfries Museum.
 Wellington School, Ayr, established for "young ladies of quality" by Mrs Gross.
 John MacCulloch's geological map of Scotland is published posthumously.

Births 
 13 January – Alexander Whyte, minister of the Free Church of Scotland and theologian (died 1921)
 12 February – John Gerard Anderson, educationalist in Queensland (died 1911 in Australia)
 21 February – Alexander Dickson, botanist (died 1887)
 18 March – James Laidlaw Maxwell, Presbyterian missionary in Taiwan (died 1921)
 31 March – William Dingwall Fordyce, Liberal politician (died 1875)
 5 April – John Scott, botanist (died 1880)
 24 May – William Mortimer Clark, Lieutenant Governor of Ontario (died 1915)
 9 June – Thomas McCall Anderson, physician (died 1908)
 26 June – Aeneas Chisholm (Bishop of Aberdeen), Roman Catholic priest (died 1918)
 3 August – Colin Scott-Moncrieff, irrigation engineer in India and Egypt and Under-Secretary for Scotland (died 1916 in England) 
 11 August – Hugh Gilzean-Reid, journalist and Liberal politician (died 1911 in London)
 7 September – Henry Campbell-Bannerman, Prime Minister of the United Kingdom (died 1908 in 10 Downing Street, London)
 23 September – Samuel Chisholm, Liberal politician and Lord Provost of Glasgow (died 1923)
 28 October – James Edward Tierney Aitchison, surgeon and botanist (died 1898)
 16 November – David Binning Monro, classical scholar (died 1905)
 4 December (probable date) – Duncan MacGregor Crerar, poet (died 1916)
 John Gregorson Campbell, minister of the church and folklorist (died 1891)
 William Baxter Collier Fyfe, genre and portrait painter (died 1882 in London)
 Jessie Seymour Irvine, psalmist (died 1887)
 William Angus Knight, philosopher and literary scholar (died 1916)
 John Rhind, architect (died 1889)
 Andrew Strath, golfer (died 1868)

Deaths 
 15 February – John Gillies, Historiographer Royal for Scotland (born 1747)
 24 February – Henry Liston, minister of the church and inventor (born 1771)
 4 April – John Grieve, poet (born 1781)
 23 June – James Mill, historian, economist, political theorist and philosopher (born 1773; died in London)
 August – Sir John Hope, British Army officer (born 1765)
 21 October – Donald Gregory, antiquarian (born 1803)
 26 November – John Loudon McAdam, civil engineer and road-builder (born 1756)
 30 December – James Graham, 3rd Duke of Montrose, nobleman, politician and Lord Justice General (born 1755)
 John Heaviside Clark, artist (born c.1771)

The arts
 Painter David Wilkie is granted a knighthood.
 5 March – George Brodie appointed Historiographer Royal

See also 

 1836 in the United Kingdom

References 

 
Scotland
1830s in Scotland